The Sovereign Award for Outstanding Trainer is a Canadian thoroughbred horse racing honor given annually since 1975 by the Jockey Club of Canada. Part of the Sovereign Awards, the "Outstanding Trainer" laurel is similar to the Eclipse Award given to horse trainers in the United States.

Honourees:
 1975 : Gil Rowntree
 1976 : Lou Cavalaris, Jr.
 1977 : R. K. "Red" Smith
 1978 : Frank H. Merrill, Jr.
 1979 : James E. Day
 1980 : Gerry Belanger
 1981 : Ron Brock
 1982 : Bill Marko
 1983 : Bill Marko
 1984 : Michael J. Doyle
 1985 : James E. Day
 1986 : Roger Attfield
 1987 : Roger Attfield
 1988 : James E. Day
 1989 : Roger Attfield
 1990 : Roger Attfield
 1991 : James E. Day
 1992 : Phil England
 1993 : Roger Attfield
 1994 : Daniel Vella
 1995 : Daniel Vella

 1996 : Barbara Minshall
 1997 : Mark Frostad
 1998 : Michael Wright, Jr.
 1999 : Mark Frostad
 2000 : Mark Frostad
 2001 : Robert Tiller
 2002 : Roger Attfield
 2003 : Robert Tiller
 2004 : Robert Tiller
 2005 : Reade Baker
 2006 : Mark Casse
 2007 : Mark Casse
 2008 : Mark Casse
 2009 : Roger Attfield
 2010 : Roger Attfield
 2011 : Mark Casse
 2012 : Mark Casse
 2013 : Mark Casse
 2014 : Mark Casse
 2015 : Mark Casse
 2016 : Mark Casse
 2017 : Mark Casse
 2018 : Mark Casse
 2019 : Mark Casse
 2020 : Mark Casse

References
The Sovereign Awards at the Jockey Club of Canada website

Horse racing awards
Horse racing in Canada